Life Goes On is a 2009 film by Sangeeta Datta. It shows how a Hindu family in Britain copes with the death of the wife and mother. The story recalls Shakespeare’s King Lear.

Plot
The film is set in modern London. The central character is Sanjay, a Hindu doctor, respected in his community. After the sudden death of his wife Manju, he struggles to relate to his three daughters. The drama follows the week from Manju's death to her funeral.

As well as dealing with grief and family ties, the film addresses inter-faith issues as Sanjay discovers that the youngest daughter Dia has a Muslim boyfriend, Imtiaz.

Wandering the streets of London the night before the funeral, Sanjay recalls his own childhood, when he left home with his parents during the partition of India.

Cast
 Girish Karnad as Sanjay
 Sharmila Tagore as Manju
 Om Puri as Alok
 Soha Ali Khan as Dia
 Rez Kempton as Imtiaz
 Neerja Naik as Tuli
 Christopher Hatherall as John
 Mukulika Banerjee as Lolita
 Misha Crosby as Abbas
 Tom Reed as Tom
 Sue Parker-Nutley as Mrs Goldsmith

Reception
The film won the Best Feature Film Award at the Pravasi International Film Festival in Delhi, and the Best Feature Film Audience Appreciation Award at the London Asian Film Festival.

Xan Brooks in the Guardian considered the acting "stiff and self-conscious".

References

External links

 
 

2009 films
2009 drama films
British drama films
British Indian films
Films about death
Films about drugs
Films set in London
2000s English-language films
2000s British films